Mattis Næss (born 18 May 1973) is a Norwegian sprint canoer who competed from the mid-1990s to the mid-2000s (decade).

Biography
He won a bronze medal in the K-2 1000 m event at the 2005 ICF Canoe Sprint World Championships in Zagreb.

Næss also competed in two Summer Olympics, earning his best finish of fifth in the K-4 1000 m event at Athens in 2004.

As of 2011, Mattis Næss is a teacher in science and mathematics. He teaches the subjects R1, T, science and P.

References

Sports-reference.com profile

1973 births
Living people
Sportspeople from Bærum
Canoeists at the 1996 Summer Olympics
Canoeists at the 2004 Summer Olympics
Norwegian male canoeists
Olympic canoeists of Norway
ICF Canoe Sprint World Championships medalists in kayak
Norwegian schoolteachers